Xu Zhouzheng (born 26 December 1995) is a Chinese athlete. He competed in the men's 100 metres event at the 2019 World Athletics Championships.

References

External links

1995 births
Living people
Chinese male sprinters
Place of birth missing (living people)
World Athletics Championships athletes for China
Athletes (track and field) at the 2018 Asian Games
Asian Games medalists in athletics (track and field)
Asian Games bronze medalists for China
Medalists at the 2018 Asian Games